Iona Township may refer to:

Iona Township, Murray County, Minnesota
Iona Township, Todd County, Minnesota
Iona Township, Lyman County, South Dakota, in Lyman County, South Dakota

Township name disambiguation pages